Arch Motorcycle Company, LLC is a high-end custom American motorcycle manufacturer founded by Keanu Reeves and Gard Hollinger in 2011.

History 
In 2007 Keanu Reeves, well known for his passion for motorcycles, met custom bike builder Gard Hollinger. Their mutual understanding would eventually lead to the two forming the Arch Motorcycle Company. Reeves employed Hollinger to customize a Harley-Davidson motorcycle, over five years of design and testing Reeves' motorcycle only retained the Harley Davidson engine. Reeves liked the finished product's handling and character so much, he suggested he and Hollinger start a motorcycle company making the motorcycle. Initially, Hollinger refused— at the time he owned his own motorcycle customization business and was not looking to take the significant step of producing an entire motorcycle and its constituent parts from scratch. According to the pair, Hollinger was eventually convinced by Reeves' persistence and argument that they could produce something great to leave behind as a legacy.

The modified Harley-Davidson motorcycle was the inspiration for the prototype Arch motorcycle which eventually led to the company's first production bike, the KRGT-1. The KRGT-1 launched in September 2014 was designed and built using the lessons learned from the initial customization of Reeves' Harley Davidson and Hollinger's extensive experience in commercial motorcycle customization.

Models 

As of November 2017 Arch have produced three models, which are later customized to customers individual specifications: KRGT-1, 1s, and Method 143. Each model is described as an "American performance cruiser"—according to Reeves and Hollinger, a motorcycle created in the typical American motorcycle style with the comfort and range of a cruiser but closer in performance to a sports bike.

The 1s and Method 143 take a sportier, more aggressive, riding position and design. The Method 143 is described as a "concept", as such it has an unusual and striking appearance, much like concept automobiles.

Media 

 The Arch Method 143 appears in the game Grand Theft Auto Online as part of The Contract DLC update under the name Western Reever.
 The Method was also added into Cyberpunk 2077 as the ARCH Nazaré in partnership with the company (note that Keanu Reeves has a major role in the game).

References

External links 
 

Motorcycle manufacturers of the United States